Bossiaea foliosa, commonly known as leafy bossiaea, is a species of flowering plant in the family Fabaceae and is endemic to south-eastern Australia. It is an erect shrub with small, broadly egg-shaped to round leaves, and bright yellow flowers.

Description
The petals are uniformly bright yellow, the petals more or less equal in length.

Taxonomy
Bossiaea foliosa was first formally described in 1825 by Allan Cunningham who found it growing in "brushy forest-land near Bathurst" and published the description in the chapter "On the Botany of the Blue Mountains" of Barron Field's book, Geographical Memoirs on New South Wales. The specific epithet (foliosa) means "leafy".

Distribution and habitat
Leafy bossiaea grows in open forest and woodland, sometimes in Sphagnum bogs, at high altitudes south from near Orange in New South Wales through the Australian Capital Territory to the ranges in the east and north-east of Victoria.

References

foliosa
Mirbelioids
Flora of New South Wales
Flora of the Australian Capital Territory
Flora of Victoria (Australia)
Plants described in 1825